Teatro desde el teatro was a Peruvian television series, produced from August 2002 to December 2008 by the América Televisión. It was lead and directed by Ricky Tosso, along with a mixed variety of actors and entertainers, and was produced by Christian Andrade. The television series transmitted a total of 300 episodes through its 7 seasons.

It is considered one of the programs with an uncommon format for the stellar strip since it was a televised theater series, that is, a theater play was broadcast live each week. Some of them were adaptations of works in the public domain.

In 2011 Tosso proposed to relaunch the series with the participation of other artists, however, the project was halted after his death in 2016.

Cast 
Prominent actors who participated in at least one of the plays include:

 Bettina Oneto
 Yvonne Frayssinet
 Carlos Alcántara Vilar
 Gianfranco Brero
 Jesús Delaveaux
 Giovanna Valcárcel
 Rossana Fernández-Maldonado
 Mónica Torres
 Marisela Puicón
 Karina Calmet
 Ebelin Ortiz
 Christian Thorsen
 Brayan Enriquez
 Gian Piero Díaz

References 
 
América Televisión original programming
Peruvian television series
Peruvian television shows